The Women's Slalom LW6/8 was one of the events held in Alpine skiing at the 1988 Winter Paralympics in Innsbruck.

In total five competitors from four nations competed.

Results

Final

References 

Slalom